Hooper's mouse (Peromyscus hooperi) is a species of rodent in the family Cricetidae.  It is the only member of the Peromyscus hooperi species group, and is found only in Mexico. The species is named for Emmett Hooper, a researcher into the taxonomy of the genus Peromyscus.

Description
The mouse is greyish in color, with a faint brownish tint, and has cream-colored underparts fading to white on the lower limbs. The tail is also darker above than below, but has only short hair. Females have six teats.

Distribution and habitat
Hooper's mouse is endemic to Mexico, where it is found only in Coahuila and in neighboring regions of San Luis Potosí and Zacatecas. In addition to grass, this region is dominated by plants such as Dasylirion and Yucca. There are no subspecies.

Biology
Females give birth to litters with an average of three young after a 33-day gestation. The young are born blind, hairless, and helpless. They begin to move after about five days, and open their eyes at thirteen days. Females undergo their first estrus at around 69 days.

The relationships between Hooper's mouse and other species of deer mouse are unclear. The shape of their teeth and of some of their scent glands resemble those of the eremicus species group, while the shape of the baculum and the position of the teats instead resemble those of the leucopus group. it is now usually considered the only member of its own species group, and may represent an evolutionary link between the other two species groups.

References

Peromyscus
Mammals described in 1977
Taxonomy articles created by Polbot